Modified Richardson iteration is an iterative method for solving a system of linear equations. Richardson iteration was proposed by Lewis Fry Richardson in his work dated 1910. It is similar to the Jacobi and Gauss–Seidel method.

We seek the solution to a set of linear equations, expressed in matrix terms as

The Richardson iteration is

where  is a scalar parameter that has to be chosen such that the sequence  converges.

Convergence 

Subtracting the exact solution , and introducing the notation for the error , we get the equality for the errors

Thus,

for any vector norm and the corresponding induced matrix norm. Thus, if , the method converges.

The error converges to  if  for all eigenvalues . If, e.g., all eigenvalues are positive, this can be guaranteed if  is chosen such that . This optimal choice yields a spectral radius of 

where  is the condition number.

If there are both positive and negative eigenvalues, the method will diverge for any  if the initial error  has nonzero components in the corresponding eigenvectors.

Equivalence to gradient descent 
Consider minimizing the function . Since this is a convex function, a sufficient condition for optimality is that the gradient is zero which gives rise to the equation

Because of the form of A, it is a positive semi-definite matrix, so it has no negative eigenvalues.

A step of gradient descent is

which is equivalent to the Richardson iteration by making .

See also
 Richardson extrapolation

References 

 

Numerical linear algebra
Iterative methods